Leschede is a railway station located in Emsbüren, Lower Saxony, Germany. The station lies on the Emsland Railway (Rheine - Norddeich) and the train services are operated by WestfalenBahn. The station was modernised with new platforms during 2012.

Train services
The following services currently call at Leschede:

Regional services  Emden - Leer - Lingen - Rheine - Münster

References

External links
 Class 152 passing through Leschede

Railway stations in Lower Saxony
Buildings and structures in Emsland